Börje Ingvar Rendin (12 November 1921 – 29 November 2016) was a Swedish sprinter. He competed at the 1948 Summer Olympics, where he was eliminated in the opening round of the 110 metres hurdles event. He was born in Malmö and competed for the Malmö Allmänna Idrottsförening, winning with them the Swedish 4 × 100 m title in 1943–44 and 1946–47.

References

1921 births
2016 deaths
Swedish male hurdlers
Olympic athletes of Sweden
Athletes (track and field) at the 1948 Summer Olympics
Sportspeople from Malmö